Greatest Hits, Vol. 2 is the second greatest hits collection by American country music singer Ronnie Milsap. The album was released in 1985 by RCA Records. Two singles were released from the project, "She Keeps the Home Fires Burning" and "Lost in the Fifties Tonight (In the Still of the Night)," both of which reached Number One on the Billboard Hot Country Singles & Tracks chart. Since its release, the album has been certified Platinum by the RIAA for shipments of over 1 million copies.

Track listing

Charts

Weekly charts

Year-end charts

References

1985 greatest hits albums
Ronnie Milsap albums
RCA Records compilation albums